General elections were held in Saint Vincent and the Grenadines on 9 December 2015. The result was a victory for the Unity Labour Party, which retained its one seat majority. However, the NDP has challenged the results in two constituencies, North Windward, and Central Leeward.

Electoral system
The 15 elected members of the House of Assembly were elected in single-member constituencies using the first-past-the-post system.

Campaign
A total of 43 candidates contested the elections. The two biggest parties were the incumbent Unity Labor Party of Prime Minister Ralph Gonsalves and the opposition New Democratic Party of Arnhim Eustace, both of which ran candidates in all the 15 constituencies. Smaller parties included the Green Party and the Democratic Republican Party, who only competed in seven and six constituencies respectively.

As 11,902 registered voters were first-time voters, both major parties looked to woo young voters. Gonsalves emphasised the importance of the youth as "solutions to the problem of our civilisation" rather than "problems to be solved." Eustace announced initiatives aimed at decreasing unemployment, including "proposals for youth, sports, and culture."

Marginal seats

Conduct
The OAS sent an observer team. There were 227 polling stations, which opened between 07:00 and 17:00.

Results

Elected MPs

Reactions
In reaction to the win Gonsalves said: "I am humbled and honoured that the people of St Vincent and the Grenadines embraced our bold vision for the future and rejected the politics of hate," he also called for national unity to address developmental challenges. However he added that there were issues in the constituencies of North Leeward and South Leeward and "we are also calling for an immediate recount to ensure that all the votes are counted in those constituencies. There are more rejected ballots than the margin and those ballots should be examined closely to determine the intent of the voters."

The NDP refused to concede the defeat according to inconsistencies in the Central Leeward constituency. A party statement read: "We of the New Democratic Party are confident that we have won the general elections based on figures received by our various polling agents. Our figures show that we won the Central Leeward seat by six votes, which means that we won the general elections by eight seats to seven." Leader of the opposition Arnhim Eustace, who won his seat against ULP candidate Luke Brown by fewer than 50 votes, added that there were many irregularities took place in his constituency of East Kingstown, including "illegal voting, and contradictory voters list to agents."

References

Saint Vincent
2015 elections in the Caribbean
Elections in Saint Vincent and the Grenadines